Adenophaedra is a plant genus of the family Euphorbiaceae first described as a genus in 1874. It is native to tropical regions of South America and Central America.

Species
 Adenophaedra cearensis Secco - Ceará
 Adenophaedra grandifolia (Klotzsch) Müll.Arg. - Costa Rica, Panama, Colombia, Venezuela, Guyana, French Guiana, Ecuador, Peru, NW Brazil 
 Adenophaedra megaphylla (Mull.Arg.) Mull.Arg. - Colombia, Ecuador, Peru, Suriname, E Brazil

References

Euphorbiaceae genera
Acalyphoideae